The South Carolina Corps of Cadets is the military component of the student body at The Citadel in Charleston, South Carolina.  The Corps of Cadets is the only residential, full-time undergraduate program at The Citadel, focusing on educating the "whole person."

History

Organization
The military organization consists of a regiment composed of five battalions, each composed of four companies of approximately 100 cadets.  The regiment and each battalion have a staff organization, and is headed by a commander.  Within each company are three platoons, and platoons are divided into squads.  The Regimental Band and Pipes is larger than other "rifle" companies, but retains essentially the same structure.  Band Company is attached to and resides in Second Battalion.

Rank
The Regimental Commander holds the rank of Cadet Colonel, while the Battalion Commanders and Regimental Executive Officer all holding the rank of Cadet Lieutenant Colonel.  Regimental Staff officers and Battalion Executive Officers are Cadet Majors, and Company Commanders and Battalion Staff officers are Cadet Captains.  Company Executive Officers and select company staff positions are Cadet First Lieutenants, and Platoon Leaders and remaining company staff positions are Cadet Second Lieutenants.  All such officer positions are filled by seniors.

Junior cadets fill all cadet sergeant ranks, from squad leaders to the regimental sergeant major, and sophomores fill all cadet corporal ranks, serving as assistant squad leaders and clerks.  Cadets without rank in any class and all members of the fourth class are cadet privates.

Class system

Cadets progress through a four-year structure which determines their eligibility for leadership positions, as well as various privileges including the number overnight and weekend leaves which can be exercised each academic semester.  The structure is largely independent of academic standing, particularly during the first year in which all cadets are known as knobs and must follow a prescribed system of training known as the Fourth Class System.  Knobs are expected to walk at 120 paces per minute anywhere on campus, utilize specific entrances and exits from buildings, walk only in designated areas, salute commissioned and cadet officers, and memorize information including historical facts and the menu in the mess hall.  While in the barracks, knobs must "brace," or pull their chin in, roll their shoulders back, and tuck their arms tightly against the sides of their body.  Many other requirements, such as military drill and inspections, exist in order to expose the cadets to the traditions and values of The Citadel, and to build camaraderie and bonds between the knobs. The Fourth Class System is unique among other Senior Military Colleges, in that it is the only freshman training period which lasts a full 9 months. The end of this training period is marked by Recognition Day, near the end of the second semester, which includes a march to Marion Square, where the cadet oath is repeated while facing the Old Citadel before returning to campus for a final physical challenge before being recognized.

Upperclass cadets remain subject to inspections and participate in military drill, and attend additional leadership training through the Krause Center for Leadership and Ethics throughout their cadet careers, gaining more and more privileges as a Class each grade level.

Cadet life

All cadets may participate in a number of activities, to include varsity sports as members of The Citadel Bulldogs teams, club teams, drill teams including The Summerall Guards, the newspaper The Brigadier, and a variety of other programs designed to enhance the academic, military, spiritual/ethical, and physical growth of each cadet.

All cadets live by a strict Honor Code, which states "A Cadet does not lie, cheat, or steal, nor tolerate those who do."  The system is run by the cadet Honor Court, which conducts investigations, trials, and recommends sanctions.  The typical sanction is expulsion.

References

The Citadel, The Military College of South Carolina student organizations
Military education and training in the United States
ROTC programs in the United States
Military units and formations established in 1842
1842 establishments in South Carolina